Rongma is a village in the Tibet Autonomous Region of China.  Its economy is dependent on wool production and coal mining.

See also
List of towns and villages in Tibet

References

Populated places in Tibet